Yevdokiya Borisovna Pasko (30 December 1919  27 January 2017) was a squadron navigator in the Soviet all-female 46th Taman Guards Night Bomber Aviation Regiment during World War II. For her successes in the war, she was honored with the title of Hero of the Soviet Union on 26 October 1944.

Early life 
Pasko was born in Lipenko village, Jeti-Ögüz District, Semirechye Oblast on 30 December 1919 to family of Ukrainian peasant immigrants; she was the youngest of twelve children. Having demonstrated a talent for mathematics from a young age, she went on to attend secondary school in Barnaul from 1936 to 1937 before returning to her native village to complete her tenth grade of schooling in 1938. Her family then decided to send her to Moscow to continue her studies, and later that year she was enrolled in the Faculty of Mechanics and Mathematics of Moscow State University. In October 1941 during her fourth semester at the school, she and some of her classmates volunteered to join the women's aviation group founded by Marina Raskova.

Military career 
After completing initial training at Engels Military Aviation School in February 1942 she was assigned to the 588th Night Bomber Aviation Regiment, with which she was deployed to the warfront in May 1942 initially as a shooter-bombardier. Soon after her arrival on the warfront she was promoted to the position of flight navigator, and eventually she became squadron navigator for squadron No.3, where she was tasked with navigating for squadron commander Mariya Smirnova. In February 1943 the regiment received the Guards designation and was renamed as the 46th Guards Night Bomber Aviation Regiment. During the war, she flew bombing missions against the Axis in Belarus, Berlin, Crimea, the Caucasus, the Kerch peninsula, Kuban, and Poland, often though extreme weather and heavy anti-aircraft fire. In total, she made approximately 790 sorties in the Polikarpov Po-2 during the war. In addition to her flight duties she helped train seven new navigators in the regiment.

Civilian life 
After the war, Pasko returned to her studies and graduated with a Ph.D. in mathematics and married her colleague Boris Malyshev. She taught for over forty years at Bauman Moscow State Technical University. She died on 27 January 2017 in Moscow and was buried at the Troyekurovskoye Cemetery.

Awards and honors 
 Hero of the Soviet Union (26 October 1944)
 Order of Lenin (26 October 1944)
 Order of the Red Banner (5 May 1943)
 Two Orders of the Patriotic War 1st Class (30 October 1943 and 11 March 1985)
 Order of Friendship of Peoples (27 November 1980)
 Two Orders of the Red Star (9 September 1980 and 26 April 1944)
 campaign and jubilee medals

See also 

 List of female Heroes of the Soviet Union
 Yevgeniya Rudneva
 Polina Gelman

References

Bibliography
 
 

1919 births
2017 deaths
Heroes of the Soviet Union
Recipients of the Order of Lenin
Recipients of the Order of the Red Banner
Burials in Troyekurovskoye Cemetery
Flight navigators
Recipients of the Medal of Zhukov
Women air force personnel of the Soviet Union
Soviet women in World War II